Elusa may refer to

Haluza, modern Hebrew name of the ancient city of Elusa, now an archaeological site in Israel
Al-Khalasa, 20th-century Palestinian village at the site of ancient Elusa
The Latin name of the French bishopric of Eauze, now part of the Roman Catholic Archdiocese of Auch
Elusa (moth), a genus of moths